Ali Pur Chatha Tehsil  (Punjabi), is a Tehsil (subdivision) of District Wazirabad in the Punjab province of Pakistan. Alipur Chatha city is the headquarter of tehsil.

References

Wazirabad District
Tehsils of Punjab, Pakistan